Sadegh Moharrami Getgasari (born 1 March 1996) is an Iranian professional footballer who plays as a defender for Dinamo Zagreb in Croatian First Football League.

Club career

Malavan
Moharrami was born in talysh family in Hashtpar, Talesh County and he started his career at youth level with Malavan. He was promoted to the first team by Dragan Skočić and made his debut for Malavan in the 2013–14 Iran Pro League against Sepahan as a substitute.

Persepolis

On 27 June 2016, Moharrami joined Iranian giants Persepolis on a two-year contract. He made his debut on 21 September 2016 in a 3–1 victory against Sepahan.

Dinamo Zagreb
On 27 June 2018, Moharrami signed a five-year contract with Croatian champions Dinamo Zagreb.

International career

Youth
He was part of the Iran U-17 squad in the 2012 AFC U-16 Championship and the 2013 FIFA U-17 World Cup.

He was invited into the Iran U-20 squad by Ali Dousti Mehr to prepare for 2014 AFC U-19 Championship.

Senior
He made his debut as a substitute against Uzbekistan on 11 September 2018.

Career statistics

Honours

Club
Persepolis
Persian Gulf Pro League: 2016–17, 2017–18
Iranian Super Cup: 2017

Dinamo Zagreb
Prva HNL (4): 2018–19, 2019–20, 2020–21, 2021–22
Croatian Cup: 2020–21
Croatian Super Cup: 2019, 2022

Individual
Persian Gulf Pro League Team of the Year (1): 2017–18

References

External links

Sadegh Moharrami at IranLeague.ir

1996 births
Living people
Sportspeople from Gilan province
Iranian footballers
Malavan players
Persepolis F.C. players
GNK Dinamo Zagreb players
NK Lokomotiva Zagreb players
Persian Gulf Pro League players
Croatian Football League players
First Football League (Croatia) players
Iran under-20 international footballers
Iranian expatriate footballers
Expatriate footballers in Croatia
Iranian expatriate sportspeople in Croatia
Association football defenders
Iran international footballers
Iranian people of Talysh descent
Talysh people
2022 FIFA World Cup players